Albert Street is an arterial road in Regina, Saskatchewan. It is one of the main roads in and out of the downtown area of the city. It is named in honour of Prince Albert, the husband and consort of Queen Victoria, and intersects Victoria Avenue (named after Queen Victoria) in centre of the city.

Albert Street is considered synonymous with Saskatchewan Highway 6, although signage now points Highway 6 to follow Ring Road and bypass the downtown area; however, some maps and remnant signage and still show Highway 6 as following Albert Street through Regina. An alternate route of the Trans-Canada Highway (Highway 1) through Regina, follows Albert Street between Highway 1 and Victoria Avenue.

Route description 
Albert Street begins at the Ring Road (formerly the Trans-Canada Highway Bypass), where it continues as Highway 6 south, and travels north through southern Regina's main commercial area. North of 25th Avenue, it passes through Albert Street South, an upscale, historial residential neighbourhood of large mansions dating from the 1910s and 1920s. Albert Street also forms the eastern boundary of Wascana Centre, providing access to the MacKenzie Art Gallery and Saskatchewan Legislative Building. After crossing the Albert Memorial Bridge across Wascana Creek, it continues north through The Crescents, also an upscale, historic residential neighborhood, and passes by the Royal Saskatchewan Museum before passing through Regina's downtown core and intersects Victoria Avenue. North of downtown, Albert Street passes through North Central and more commercial development before reaching Ring Road. Albert Street is a short freeway between Ring Road and Highway 11A (formerly Highway 11), before it leaves Regina, passes through the Sherwood Industrial Park, and continues north and Highway 6 north.

Major intersections 
From south to north.

References

Roads in Regina, Saskatchewan
Former segments of the Trans-Canada Highway